Image consulting is a professional field that aims to improve the image of the client personally or professionally through appearance, behavior, and communication. It is the process of evaluating the effect of a person's appearance on their professional image. 

Image consultants are usually experts in marketing and fashion; they train their clients to improve their image for social events or to achieve certain goals. Not only individuals but also companies can be clients of image consultants, although main clients remain executives and politicians. An image consultant's main focus is on dressing, personal style, clothes buying, body language, and etiquette, taking a customer through a process of evaluating their lifestyle and helping them change their body language and attire in order to help improve their image.

The term originated in the seventies. John T. Molloy published the book Dress for Success in the United States in 1975. This book focused on how dressing and personal image affect achieving personal and professional goals. The book was not based on the author's opinion, but on tests conducted on subjects and helped spread the "power dressing" concept. At this time, the public increased its interest in how clothing affects one's goals, and the book was an international success.

In the eighties, a few firms started offering image consulting services specifically for events. Eventually, celebrities started hiring them for their everyday styling and life. Rachel Zoe, a fashion stylist and image consultant, became a fashion icon for styling celebrities. The Conselle Institute of Image Management was founded over 40 years ago. In 1990, the Association of Image Consultants International (AICI) was born, with more than 1,300 members today.

Today, the concept of power dressing has become a part of work culture, helping establish a market for the field of image consulting. The practice has seen a rise in demand due to customer-centric verticals such as retail, hospitality, and public relations. The term itself has broadened to include etiquette, body language, communication, presentation, and personal branding.

See also
Wardrobe stylist
Public relations

References

Fashion occupations